Spencer Eli Daniels (born December 23, 1992) is an American film and television actor born in  Los Angeles, California. He began acting professionally at the age of ten. He has appeared in over 30 films and TV series, including Star Trek (2009 reboot), The Curious Case of Benjamin Button and the recurring role of Tyler Lomand on the series Crash, which terminated in 2009. In 2014, his film The Midnight Game was released by Anchor Bay Entertainment.

Personal life

Daniels is Jewish.

Filmography

Film

Television

References

External links
spencerdaniels.tv, Spencer Daniels official website

1992 births
Male actors from Los Angeles
American male child actors
American male film actors
American male television actors
Living people
People from Tarzana, Los Angeles
21st-century American male actors
Jewish American male actors